Zirnay, also rendered as Zirna, may refer to:
 Zirnay-e Olya
 Zirnay-e Sofla